The Opuyo–Moroto High Voltage Power Line is a high voltage electricity power line, connecting the high voltage substation at Opuyo, a southern suburb of the city of Soroti, in the Eastern Region to another high voltage substation at Moroto, in the Northern Region of Uganda. The power line was energized in June  2021.

Location

Overview
The power line was developed as part of plans to improve grid power delivery and reliability to the districts that constitute the Karamoja sub-region. Using US$80 million, borrowed from the Islamic Development Bank, the government of Uganda funded the construction of this power line, including a new substation at Moroto. Grid electricity was introduced in Karamoja in 2013, but distribution remains sparse.

Associated power lines
Each of the five districts in the Karamoja sub-region is expected to receive a feeder line off this power line, to bring grid electricity closer to the people who need it.

Project Engineering and work supervision
Supervision of works contract was awarded to Ghods Niroo Engineering Company .

Construction
Nanjing Daji Steel Tower Manufacturing Company Limited of China, is the main contractor on this project. Construction began in July 2017 and was concluded in 2021, with commercial commissioning in June 2021.

See also
Energy in Uganda
List of power stations in Uganda

References

External links
Website of the Uganda Electricity Transmission Company Limited
Karuma Power Project Works Begin As Experts Meet Community

High-voltage transmission lines in Uganda
Energy infrastructure in Africa
Energy in Uganda
Energy infrastructure completed in 2021
2021 establishments in Uganda